The arrondissement of Clermont-Ferrand is an arrondissement of France in the Puy-de-Dôme department in the Auvergne-Rhône-Alpes region. It has 73 communes.

Composition

The communes of the arrondissement of Clermont-Ferrand, and their INSEE codes, are:

 Aubière (63014)
 Aulnat (63019)
 Authezat (63021)
 Aydat (63026)
 Beaumont (63032)
 Beauregard-l'Évêque (63034)
 Billom (63040)
 Blanzat (63042)
 Bongheat (63044)
 Bouzel (63049)
 Busséol (63059)
 Cébazat (63063)
 Le Cendre (63069)
 Ceyrat (63070)
 Chamalières (63075)
 Chanonat (63084)
 Chas (63096)
 Châteaugay (63099)
 Chauriat (63106)
 Clermont-Ferrand (63113)
 Corent (63120)
 Cournols (63123)
 Cournon-d'Auvergne (63124)
 Le Crest (63126)
 Durtol (63141)
 Égliseneuve-près-Billom (63146)
 Espirat (63154)
 Estandeuil (63155)
 Fayet-le-Château (63157)
 Gerzat (63164)
 Glaine-Montaigut (63168)
 Isserteaux (63177)
 Laps (63188)
 Lempdes (63193)
 Manglieu (63205)
 Les Martres-de-Veyre (63214)
 Mauzun (63216)
 Mirefleurs (63227)
 Montmorin (63239)
 Mur-sur-Allier (63226)
 Neuville (63252)
 Nohanent (63254)
 Olloix (63259)
 Orcet (63262)
 Orcines (63263)
 Pérignat-lès-Sarliève (63272)
 Pérignat-sur-Allier (63273)
 Pignols (63280)
 Pont-du-Château (63284)
 Reignat (63297)
 La Roche-Blanche (63302)
 La Roche-Noire (63306)
 Romagnat (63307)
 Royat (63308)
 Saint-Amant-Tallende (63315)
 Saint-Bonnet-lès-Allier (63325)
 Saint-Dier-d'Auvergne (63334)
 Saint-Genès-Champanelle (63345)
 Saint-Georges-sur-Allier (63350)
 Saint-Jean-des-Ollières (63365)
 Saint-Julien-de-Coppel (63368)
 Saint-Maurice (63378)
 Saint-Sandoux (63395)
 Saint-Saturnin (63396)
 Sallèdes (63405)
 La Sauvetat (63413)
 Tallende (63425)
 Trézioux (63438)
 Vassel (63445)
 Vertaizon (63453)
 Veyre-Monton (63455)
 Vic-le-Comte (63457)
 Yronde-et-Buron (63472)

History

The arrondissement of Clermont-Ferrand was created in 1800. At the January 2017 reorganisation of the arrondissements of Puy-de-Dôme, it gained one commune from the arrondissement of Riom, and it lost three communes to the arrondissement of Ambert, 21 communes to the arrondissement of Issoire, 17 communes to the arrondissement of Riom and four communes to the arrondissement of Thiers. In January 2021 it lost the commune of Saulzet-le-Froid to the arrondissement of Issoire.

As a result of the reorganisation of the cantons of France which came into effect in 2015, the borders of the cantons are no longer related to the borders of the arrondissements. The cantons of the arrondissement of Clermont-Ferrand were, as of January 2015:

 Aubière
 Beaumont
 Billom
 Bourg-Lastic
 Chamalières
 Clermont-Ferrand-Centre
 Clermont-Ferrand-Est
 Clermont-Ferrand-Nord
 Clermont-Ferrand-Nord-Ouest
 Clermont-Ferrand-Ouest
 Clermont-Ferrand-Sud
 Clermont-Ferrand-Sud-Est
 Clermont-Ferrand-Sud-Ouest
 Cournon-d'Auvergne
 Gerzat
 Herment
 Montferrand
 Pont-du-Château
 Rochefort-Montagne
 Royat
 Saint-Amant-Tallende
 Saint-Dier-d'Auvergne
 Vertaizon
 Veyre-Monton
 Vic-le-Comte

References

Clermont-Ferrand